DB 601 may refer to:
Daimler-Benz DB 601, a V12 reciprocating aircraft engine of the 1930s and 1940s
DB Class 601, the power heads or locomotives used for Trans Europ Express trains in Germany